Navalvillar de Pela is a Spanish municipality in the province of Badajoz, Extremadura. It has a population of 4,816 (2007) and an area of 251.2 km².

References

External links
Official website 
Profile 

Municipalities in the Province of Badajoz